Carolyn Barbara Kuhl (born July 24, 1952) is a judge on the Superior Court of California for the County of Los Angeles and a former nominee to the United States Court of Appeals for the Ninth Circuit. After receiving her Juris Doctor degree in 1977 from Duke Law School, she clerked for future Supreme Court Justice, Anthony M. Kennedy, from 1977 to 1978. From 1981 to 1986, she served in the United States Department of Justice. She worked as a partner in the Los Angeles law firm of Munger, Tolles & Olson, focusing on civil business litigation with a specialty in appellate litigation, from 1986 to 1995. She became a judge on the Superior Court of California for the County of Los Angeles in 1995 and was nominated to a seat on the United States Court of Appeals for the Ninth Circuit on June 22, 2001 by President George W. Bush.

Background
Kuhl was born on July 24, 1952 in St. Louis, Missouri.

In 1974, Judge Kuhl received a bachelor's degree in Chemistry from Princeton University with honors. Judge Kuhl was in the second class of women ever to graduate from Princeton. She graduated with honors from Duke Law School in 1977 where she was a member of the Order of the Coif and an editor of the Duke Law Journal.

From 1977 to 1978, Kuhl clerked for future U.S. Supreme Court Justice, Anthony M. Kennedy, when he was an appellate judge on the United States Court of Appeals for the Ninth Circuit.

From 1981 to 1986, she served in the United States Department of Justice. She served as Deputy Solicitor General, Deputy Assistant Attorney General in the Civil Division, and as Special Assistant to Attorney General William French Smith.

As Deputy Solicitor General of the United States, she argued cases before the United States Supreme Court and supervised the work of the other attorneys in the office. As Deputy Assistant Attorney General in the Civil Division, Judge Kuhl supervised all civil appellate litigation handled by the Justice Department nationwide. She also supervised civil trial litigation involving federal agency programs—in particular, important cases raising critical constitutional or statutory issues.

From 1986 to 1995, Judge Kuhl was a partner in the Los Angeles law firm of Munger, Tolles & Olson. Her practice focused on civil business litigation in both federal and state courts with a specialty in appellate litigation.

In 1995, she became a judge on the Superior Court of California for the County of Los Angeles.

Ninth Circuit nomination under Bush

On June 22, 2001, Judge Kuhl was nominated by President George W. Bush to a seat on the United States Court of Appeals for the Ninth Circuit vacated by the Judge James R. Browning who had taken senior status in 2000. Despite being rated "Well Qualified" by the American Bar Association, her nomination was not processed during the Democratic-controlled 107th Congress due to pressure from several feminist groups. Rather, it became stalled in the Senate Judiciary Committee under the leadership of then chairman, Senator Patrick Leahy, D-VT.

There were three main reasons for the opposition to her nomination. First, while at the Department of Justice Judge Kuhl urged the attorney general to reverse an Internal Revenue Service policy denying tax-exempt status to Bob Jones University, which practiced racial discrimination.

She did so on two technical points, which sidestepped dealing with the university's racial policies.  She argued that Congress, rather than an administrative agency like the IRS, should make such determinations, and many years later, said she was concerned that the IRS might use its power to define “public policy” to deprive tax-exempt status to all-girls schools (such as the high school Kuhl herself had attended) or all-women's colleges.  Charles J. Cooper, who was also at the Justice Department at the time working with Judge Kuhl on the case, has stated: "Neither [Kuhl] nor anyone else favored such a policy [of affording tax-exempt status to racially-discriminatory educational institutions]; to the contrary, all agreed that racially discriminatory private schools should not be tax-exempt, and draft legislation to that effect was prepared and proposed to Congress.  [Kuhl and others involved in the case] just believed that if the school was going to lose the tax exemption that it was entitled to under 501(c)(3), Congress and not the IRS should make that decision."

Second, Kuhl had a limited role in the drafting of the brief filed by then-Acting Solicitor General Charles Fried in Thornburgh v. American College of Obstetricians and Gynecologists, 476 U.S. 747 (1986), in which Fried, acting on behalf of President Ronald Reagan, urged the Supreme Court to overturn Roe v. Wade.  Although Fried, whose name appears first on the brief, acknowledged that he wrote the “overrule-Roe part of the brief” himself, pro-choice groups attributed the position to Kuhl as well, whose name appeared third on the brief.

Third, while serving on the Los Angeles Superior Court in 1999, Kuhl dismissed one of several counts in a case brought by a woman alleging the tort of intrusion after her doctor, while conducting a breast exam, had invited into the examining room a pharmaceutical company representative who was observing the doctor's work as part of his participation in an oncology mentorship program designed to improve care for breast cancer patients.  The woman, Azucena Sanchez-Scott, later testified that an unidentified man was present when her doctor had her undress. She said that when she grew flushed, the man laughed at her. When the woman discovered later from the receptionist that the man was a drug company salesman, she sued under a new state law. Judge Kuhl ruled that because Ms. Sanchez-Scott had not explicitly objected to the man's presence, "I think it cannot be said that there was a reasonable expectation of privacy." Judge Kuhl ruled that the remaining counts could proceed to trial. The case ultimately settled, with the plaintiff receiving an undisclosed sum.

In the 2002 midterm congressional elections, the Republicans regained control of the Senate. During the new 108th Congress, Senator Orrin Hatch, R-UT, the new Republican chairman of the Senate Judiciary Committee, began to process previously blocked judicial nominees. California's two Democratic senators, Dianne Feinstein and Barbara Boxer, announced their opposition to Kuhl's nomination. Contrary to Feinstein's and Boxer's wishes, and the tradition of having the approval of the state's own Senators, Hatch gave Kuhl a committee hearing, and passed her out of committee.

In a major departure from Senate tradition, the Democrats decided to use the filibuster in a judicial nomination, thus stopping Kuhl from having an up-down vote on her confirmation. Her nomination was filibustered on November 14, 2003 when the Senate failed to end debate with a 53-43 cloture vote, which fell 7 votes shy of the 60 needed to overcome the filibuster. In December 2004, Judge Kuhl withdrew her nomination. In 2006, new Bush nominee Sandra Segal Ikuta was confirmed to the seat to which Kuhl had originally been nominated.

Current life
On May 26, 2006, Chief Justice Ronald M. George of the California Supreme Court appointed Judge Kuhl to the Judicial Council of California, the constitutional policy-making body of the California courts.  
Judge Kuhl has also served as a member of the Advisory Committee on Civil Jury Instructions as well as the Collaborative Court-County Working Group on Enhanced Collections. Additionally, she was a member of the Governing Committee for the Center for Judicial Education and Research (CJER).

In October 2012, Kuhl was elected to the post of assistant presiding judge of the court for 2013 and 2014, defeating Judge Dan T. Oki. By court tradition, she served her two-year term as assistant presiding judge and then ran unopposed for the post of presiding judge for 2015 and 2016.

Law reform work
Kuhl was elected to the American Law Institute in October 1988 and was elected to the ALI Council in May 2012. She served as an Adviser on the Principles of the Law of Aggregate Litigation project, and continues to serve as an Adviser on Principles of Government Ethics and the Restatement Third, the Law of Consumer Contracts.

Personal
Kuhl lives with her two daughters and her husband, William "Bill" Highberger, who is a judge on the Los Angeles County Superior Court.

See also
 George W. Bush judicial appointment controversies
 filibuster
 cloture

References

1952 births
Living people
California state court judges
Superior court judges in the United States
Lawyers from Los Angeles
Princeton University alumni
Duke University School of Law alumni
American women judges
California Republicans
People associated with Munger, Tolles & Olson
21st-century American women